Zieleniew may refer to the following places:
Zieleniew, Gmina Krośniewice in Łódź Voivodeship (central Poland)
Zieleniew, Gmina Krzyżanów in Łódź Voivodeship (central Poland)
Zieleniew, Łęczyca County in Łódź Voivodeship (central Poland)